Georg Albert Weinstein (October 13, 1885 – December 7, 1969) was a German track and field athlete who competed in the 1908 Summer Olympics. In 1908 he  finished sixth, seventh, or possibly 8th in the long jump competition.

References

External links
list of German athletes

1885 births
1969 deaths
German male long jumpers
Olympic athletes of Germany
Athletes (track and field) at the 1908 Summer Olympics